Xifeng County is a county in the northeast of Liaoning province, China, bordering Jilin to the north and east.

Administrative divisions
The county administers eight towns, four townships, and six ethnic townships.

Towns:
Xifeng, Pinggang, Gaojiadian, Anmin, Zhenxing, Liangquan, Tiande, Fangmu

Townships:
Taoran Township, Baiyu Township, Diaoyu Township, Gengke Township, Mingde Manchu Ethnic Township, Dexing Manchu Ethnic Township, Chengping Manchu Ethnic Township, Helong Manchu Ethnic Township, Yingchang Manchu Ethnic Township, Jinxing Manchu Ethnic Township

Climate

References

External links

County-level divisions of Liaoning
Tieling